Democratic Choice of Russia – United Democrats (Russian: Демократический выбор России — Объединенные демократы) was a bloc that contested the 1995 Russian legislative election, winning 3.86% of ballots and getting 9 candidates (all members of the Democratic Choice of Russia party) elected through majoritarian districts. The bloc included Democratic Choice of Russia, the Russian Party of Social Democracy, the Peasants' Party of Y. Chernichenko, the Congress of National Associations of A.Rudenko-Desnyak. Additionally, the bloc was joined by organizations Women for Solidarity (Iren Andreeva) and Military People for Democracy (of Vladimir Smirnov).

References
http://www.partinform.ru/ros_mn/rm_4.htm

Defunct political party alliances in Russia
Liberal parties in Russia
Liberalism in Russia